New Jersey's 9th Legislative District is one of 40 in the New Jersey Legislature, covering the Atlantic County municipalities of Galloway Township and Port Republic City; the Burlington County municipalities of Bass River Township, Tabernacle Township and Washington Township; and the Ocean County municipalities of Barnegat Township, Barnegat Light Borough, Beach Haven Borough, Beachwood Borough, Berkeley Township, Eagleswood Township, Harvey Cedars Borough, Lacey Township, Little Egg Harbor Township, Long Beach Township, Ocean Township, Ocean Gate Borough, Pine Beach Borough, Seaside Park Borough, Ship Bottom Borough, South Toms River Borough, Stafford Township, Surf City Borough and Tuckerton Borough as of the 2011 apportionment.

Demographic characteristics
As of the 2020 United States census, the district had a population of 235,539, of whom 194,652 (82.6%) were of voting age. The racial makeup of the district was 195,976 (83.2%) White, 9,031 (3.8%) African American, 564 (0.2%) Native American, 6,500 (2.8%) Asian, 71 (0.0%) Pacific Islander, 7,247 (3.1%) from some other race, and 16,150 (6.9%) from two or more races. Hispanic or Latino of any race were 21,473 (9.1%) of the population.

The district had 193,047 registered voters as of December 1, 2021, of whom 73,377 (38.0%) were registered as unaffiliated, 70,287 (36.4%) were registered as Republicans, 46,730 (24.2%) were registered as Democrats, and 2,653 (1.4%) were registered to other parties.

Political representation
For the 2022–2023 session, the district is represented in the State Senate by Christopher J. Connors (R, Lacey Township) and in the General Assembly by DiAnne Gove (R, Long Beach Township) and Brian E. Rumpf (R, Little Egg Harbor Township).

The legislative district overlaps with  New Jersey's 2nd, 3rd, and  New Jersey's 4th congressional districts.

1965–1973
During the period of time after the 1964 Supreme Court decision in Reynolds v. Sims and before the establishment of a 40-district legislature in 1973, the 9th District encompassed the entirety of Union County. Two Senators were elected in the 1965 election (Republican Nelson Stamler and Democrat Mildred Barry Hughes) while three were elected in the 1967 and 1971 elections. Republicans Nicholas S. LaCorte, Frank X. McDermott, and Matthew John Rinaldo won the 1967 election though LaCorte would resign on December 7, 1970 to become a tax appeals judge. Democrat Jerry Fitzgerald English would win a 1971 special election to complete LaCorte's term. Republicans would win the three seats in the regular 1971 election with Rinaldo, McDermott, and Jerome Epstein receiving the most votes in that election. Following Rinaldo's election to Congress in 1972 elections, Democrat William J. McCloud would be elected to complete Rinaldo's term in the Senate.

In the Assembly, for the 1967, 1969, and 1971 elections, Union County was divided into three districts (9A, 9B, and 9C) that each elected two members of the Assembly. In addition, in the 1967 and 1969 elections, one additional member of the Assembly was elected county-wide.

The members elected to the Assembly from each district are as follows:

District composition since 1973
Since the creation of 40 equal-population districts statewide in 1973, the 9th District has been based in and around Ocean County. For the 1973 district, the 9th consisted of most of Ocean County (all municipalities except Little Egg Harbor Township, Tuckerton, Manchester Township, Lakehurst, Point Pleasant, and Point Pleasant Beach), Woodland Township in Burlington County, and Millstone Township in Monmouth County. In the 1981 redistricting, the large townships of Lakewood, Brick, and Dover and other nearby small boroughs were removed but the remainder of Ocean County municipalities were added as well as Bass River Township and Burlington County's New Hanover Township, Wrightstown, and North Hanover. Jackson Township and Plumsted Township and the northern Burlington municipalities were shifted out of the 9th in the 1991 redistricting; more of southern Burlington was added including Tabernacle, Woodland, Washington, and Bass River townships and Egg Harbor City in Atlantic County were also added to the district for this decade. In the 2001 redistricting, the Ocean County portion of the district barely changed but only Washington and Bass River townships remained in Burlington County and the municipalities that made up the Atlantic County portion of the district were Hammonton and Folsom.

Election history

Election results, 1973–present

Senate

General Assembly

Election results, 1965–1973

Senate

General Assembly

District 9A

District 9B

District 9C

District 9 At-large

References

Atlantic County, New Jersey
Burlington County, New Jersey
Ocean County, New Jersey
09